Zasosenye is a rural locality (a village) in Kichmegnskoye Rural Settlement, Kichmengsko-Gorodetsky District, Vologda Oblast, Russia. The population was 10 as of 2002.

Geography 
Zasosenye is located 11 km northeast of Kichmengsky Gorodok (the district's administrative centre) by road. Zhukovo is the nearest rural locality.

References 

Rural localities in Kichmengsko-Gorodetsky District